Lectures pour tous was the first French television show discussing Literature. The show was created and presented by Pierre Dumayet, it was broadcast from March 27 1953 to May 8 1968, on RTF.

Premise

The shows principle was to analyse and review literature on television. Authors of books were interviewed and discussed, the show was designed to entertain and educate the french viewing public. People of all backgrounds were invited to discuss literature on the show.

Reception

The show was critically acclaimed for elevating the quality of television on French television. According to Le Monde in 1962 Lectures pour tous had between 26% and 32% of the French viewing public.

References

1953 French television series debuts
1968 French television series endings
1950s French television series
1960s French television series
French-language television shows